Bat Loves the Night is a non-fiction children's picture book written by Nicola Davies,  illustrated by Sarah Fox-Davies, and published August 19, 2004 by Candlewick Press.

Summary
The Bat Loves the Night tells the story about a bat, and has information about bats with illustrations that show them flying, hanging, and walking. The book also talks about the different kinds of bats in the world.

Reception
Bat Loves the Night received positive reviews from Kirkus Reviews, Booklist, School Library Journal, The New York Times Book Review, and Publishers Weekly.

References

2004 children's books
British children's books
British picture books
Candlewick Press books
Children's non-fiction books
Fictional bats
English non-fiction books